The Renault R.S.20 is a Formula One car designed by the Renault F1 Team to compete in the 2020 Formula One World Championship.

The chassis was designed by Nick Chester, Martin Tolliday, Simon Virrill, Matthew Harman and Dirk de Beer with Marcin Budkowski overseeing the design and production of the car as executive technical director and Rémi Taffin leading the powertrain design. The car was planned to make its competitive debut at the 2020 Australian Grand Prix, but this was delayed when the next nine events in were cancelled or postponed in response to the COVID-19 pandemic. The R.S.20 made its debut at the 2020 Austrian Grand Prix. It was driven by Daniel Ricciardo and Esteban Ocon in 2020. Ricciardo scored Renault's first podium since it returned to Formula One at the 2020 Eifel Grand Prix, while Ocon scored his first career podium at the 2020 Sakhir Grand Prix.

Because of financial and logistical challenges imposed by the COVID-19 pandemic, an agreement was reached between the FIA and Formula One teams so that 2020 cars would be carried over to 2021, with development of certain areas of the cars frozen after the end of the 2020 season. The R.S.20 was updated for the 2021 season and rebranded as the Alpine A521 after Renault rebranded its Formula One team under the Alpine name.

Development 

The Renault R.S.20 is the last car to have been designed by Nick Chester during his time with the team. Chester was replaced as Technical Director in the 2019-20 off-season by former McLaren Engineering Director Pat Fry.

Complete Formula One results 
(key)

Notes

 Driver failed to finish the race but was classified as they had completed over 90% of the winner's race distance.

References

External links 
Renault F1 Team official website

R.S.20